ULY may refer to:

Geography

 The IATA airport code for Ulyanovsk Vostochny Airport (ICAO airport code:UWLW)

Linguistics

 A unified Latin-Script Uyghur alphabet, Uyghur Latin Yéziqi